Duncan Snidal, FBA is professor of international relations at Nuffield College, University of Oxford and professor emeritus at University of Chicago. Snidal has research interests in international relations theory, institutional organizations, cooperation, international law, and rational choice.

Selected publications
Abbott, Kenneth W., and Duncan Snidal. “Hard and Soft Law in International Governance.” International Organization 54, no. 3 (2000): 421–56. https://doi.org/10.1162/002081800551280.
Abbott, Kenneth W., and Duncan Snidal. “The Governance Triangle: Regulatory Standards Institutions and the Shadow of the State.” The Politics of Global Regulation 44 (2009): 44–88.
Abbott, Kenneth W., and Duncan Snidal. “Why States Act through Formal International Organizations.” Journal of Conflict Resolution 42, no. 1 (1998): 3–32.
Achen, Christopher H., and Duncan Snidal. “Rational Deterrence Theory and Comparative Case Studies.” World Politics 41, no. 2 (January 1989): 143–69.
Grieco, Joseph, Robert Powell, and Duncan Snidal. “The Relative-Gains Problem for International Cooperation.” The American Political Science Review 87, no. 3 (1993): 727–43. https://doi.org/10.2307/2938747.
Koremenos, Barbara, Charles Lipson, and Duncan Snidal. “The Rational Design of International Institutions.” International Organization 55, no. 4 (2001): 761–99. https://doi.org/10.1162/002081801317193592.
Koremenos, Barbara, Charles Lipson, and Duncan Snidal. The Rational Design of International Institutions. Cambridge University Press, 2003.
Reus-Smit, Christian, and Duncan Snidal, eds. The Oxford Handbook of International Relations. The Oxford Handbook of International Relations. Oxford University Press, 2009. https://doi.org/10.1093/oxfordhb/9780199219322.001.0001.
Snidal, Duncan. “Coordination versus Prisoners’ Dilemma: Implications for International Cooperation and Regimes.” The American Political Science Review 79, no. 4 (December 1985): 923–42.
Snidal, Duncan. “Relative Gains and the Pattern of International Cooperation.” The American Political Science Review 85, no. 3 (September 1991): 701–26. https://doi.org/10.2307/1963847.
Snidal, Duncan. “The Game Theory of International Politics.” World Politics: A Quarterly Journal of International Relations, 1985, 25–57.
Snidal, Duncan. “The Limits of Hegemonic Stability Theory.” International Organization 39, no. 4 (Autumn 1985): 579–614.

References 

Fellows of Nuffield College, Oxford
Living people
Year of birth missing (living people)
British political scientists
Fellows of the British Academy